Re Barleycorn Enterprises Ltd [1970] Ch 465 is a UK insolvency law case, concerning the priority of creditors in a company winding up. It was held that fees for liquidation came in priority to preferential claims and floating charges. This was overturned by the House of Lords in Buchler v Talbot, but reinstated by Parliament through an amendment to the Insolvency Act 1986 s 176ZA.

Facts
Barleycorn Enterprises Ltd had been put into compulsory winding up. The directors had employed Cardiff based chartered accountants, Mathias and Davies, to prepare a financial statement for the company. Their fee was £202 10s, and were approved by the official receiver.

However, the company liquidator argued that the accountants should only be paid after preferential creditors and debenture holders. In this case, there was no money left. The judge at first instance, Sir Owen Temple Morris QC, held that the accountants had priority. The liquidator appealed.

Judgment
The Court of Appeal held that the accountants' fees fell under the expenses of liquidation. Tom Denning, Baron Denning gave the first judgment.

Sachs LJ concurred.

Phillimore LJ agreed.

See also
Buchler v Talbot [2004] UKHL 9, [2004] 2 AC 298
Insolvency Act 1986 s 176ZA
Re MC Bacon Ltd (No 2) [1991] Ch 127

Notes

References
'Recent developments in the law and practice relating to the creation of security for companies' indebtedness' (2009) 30(6) Company Lawyer 163-168
'What liquidation does for secured creditors, and what it does for you' (2008) 71(5) MLR 699-733

United Kingdom company case law
United Kingdom insolvency case law
Court of Appeal (England and Wales) cases
1970 in case law
1970 in British law
Lord Denning cases